Sveriges runinskrifter (English: "Sweden's rune inscriptions") is a multi-volume catalog of rune inscriptions found in various Swedish provinces. The earliest volume of this ongoing series dates to 1900, and, by 1981, 15 volumes had been published.

Sveriges runinskrifter established the standard cataloging system for Swedish rune inscriptions. Each inscription is identified by a province code and a catalog number. For example:

 U 11 - Uppland rune inscription 11
 Ög 179 - Östergötland rune inscription 179

Today, this cataloging system is used by electronic databases such as Rundata and commonly seen in scholarly publications. This cataloging system has also been imitated and extended by scholars in other countries.

See also 

 Bautil
 List of runestones
 Runic alphabet
 Runestone
 Rundata

References 

 
 
 
 
 
 
 
 
 
 (Volume X is under preparation, see (in Swedish) Upplands runinskrifter del 5, digital supplement.)

External links 
 List of publications at the National Heritage Board
  Bibliography for Sveriges runinskrifter at the Royal Academy of Letters, History and Antiquities
 "Viking Answer Lady" rune bibliography

Runology
Runic inscriptions